CRST Van Expedited, Inc. v. Equal Employment Opportunity Commission, 578 U.S. ___ (2016), was a United States Supreme Court case regarding whether a prevailing party must succeed on the merits to seek attorney's fees. In a unanimous decision authored by Associate Justice Anthony Kennedy, the Court held that a defendant need not succeed on the merits in order to be the prevailing party for the purposes of seeking attorney fees.

Following the Supreme Court's decision in CRST's favor, the matter was remanded to the Eighth Circuit Court of Appeals and back to the United States District Court for the Northern District of Iowa for further proceedings. In December 2017, the District Court ordered the EEOC to pay CRST $3,317,289.67 in attorney fees., The EEOC appealed this order to the Eighth Circuit. The Eighth Circuit affirmed the fee award to CRST, which the EEOC paid in 2020.

References

External links
 

United States Supreme Court cases
United States Supreme Court cases of the Roberts Court
2016 in United States case law